Michael Monaghan (born 1812 in Ardagh, County Longford) was an Irish clergyman and bishop for the Roman Catholic Diocese of Roseau, Dominica. He was appointed bishop in 1851. Educated for the priesthood at St. Patrick's College, Maynooth. He was ordained a bishop in 1852 by fellow Ardagh man, Bishiop of Port of Spain Richard Patrick Smith. He died in 1855.

Bishop Monaghans brother Thomas also studied at Maynooth College and became a priest, serving in Drumshambo, Co. Leitrim.

References 

1812 births
1855 deaths
Roman Catholic bishops of Roseau
19th-century Irish bishops
Irish expatriate Catholic bishops
Alumni of St Patrick's College, Maynooth